WIZM (1410 kHz, “WIZM NewsTalk 1410AM, 92.3FM”) is an AM radio station  broadcasting a News Talk Information format. Licensed to La Crosse, Wisconsin, United States, the station serves the La Crosse area.  The station is currently owned by Mid-West Family Broadcasting, and features programming from CBS News Radio, Genesis Communications Network, Premiere Networks, USA Radio Network, and Westwood One.

Programming

WIZM carries The Glenn Beck Program, Sean Hannity, The Rush Limbaugh Show, Dave Ramsey, Coast to Coast AM, and La Crosse Talk PM with Rick Solem. The station is also the local radio affiliate for NASCAR races via the Motor Racing Network and the Performance Racing Network.

History

WIZM was first licensed, with the sequentially assigned call letters WKBH, in August 1926 to the Callaway Music Company at 211 Main Street in La Crosse. In 1971 the station was purchased by Family Radio, Inc., and on July 14, 1971, the call letters were changed to WIZM.

References

External links

FCC History Cards for WIZM (covering WKBH / WIZM from 1926 to 1980)

IZM
News and talk radio stations in the United States
Radio stations established in 1926
1926 establishments in Wisconsin